Viktor Ruslanovych Shumik (born 21 May 1998) is a Ukrainian racewalker. In 2019, he competed in the men's 20 kilometres walk at the 2019 World Athletics Championships held in Doha, Qatar. He finished in 30th place.

In 2019, he also competed in the men's 20 kilometres walk at the 2019 European Athletics U23 Championships held in Gävle, Sweden. He finished in 10th place.

References

External links 
 

Living people
1998 births
Place of birth missing (living people)
Ukrainian male racewalkers
World Athletics Championships athletes for Ukraine